Sohrab Khan Sarki (born ) is a Pakistani politician who has been a member of the Provincial Assembly of Sindh since August 2018. He previously had been a member of the Provincial Assembly of Sindh, from May 2013 to May 2018.

Early life and education

He was born on 30 July 1968 in Jacobabad.

He has a degree of Bachelor of Medicine and Bachelor of Surgery from Dow Medical College.

Political career

He was elected to the Provincial Assembly of Sindh as a candidate of Pakistan Peoples Party (PPP) from Constituency PS-15 (Jacobabad-cum-Kashmore-I) in the 2013 Sindh provincial election.

He was re-elected to Provincial Assembly of Sindh as a candidate of PPP from PS-2 (Jacobabad-II) in the 2018 Sindh provincial election.

References

Living people
Sindh MPAs 2013–2018
1968 births
Pakistan People's Party MPAs (Sindh)
Sindh MPAs 2018–2023